Lídice da Mata (born March 12, 1956) is a Brazilian politician. She has represented Bahia in the Federal Senate from 2011 to 2019, when she returned to the Chamber. Previously she was a Federal Deputy from Bahia from 1987 to 1991 and from 2007 to 2011. She was mayor of Salvador from 1993 to 1997. She is a member of the Brazilian Socialist Party.

See also
 List of mayors of Salvador, Bahia

References

Living people
1956 births
Members of the Federal Senate (Brazil)
Brazilian Socialist Party politicians
Members of the Chamber of Deputies (Brazil) from Bahia